Senecio luzoniensis is a species of the genus Senecio and family Asteraceae and endemic to the Philippines.

References

External links

luzoniensis
Flora of the Philippines